Scaevola macrophylla, commonly known as large-flowered scaevola, is an erect herb (woody at base) growing  to 0.4 m high, with blue flowers, in the family Goodeniaceae, native to Western Australia.  

The species was first formally described in 1854 by Willem Hendrik de Vriese and in 1868  George Bentham in the fourth volume of Flora Australiensis assigned it to the genus, Scaevola.

It occurs in the Cape Riche area in south-western Western Australia.
The species is described as "extremely rare", being documented on only four occasions, a discovery after a controlled burn in 2021 was its first record since 1990.

It has been declared to be a threatened species, and critically endangered under the EPBC Act.

References

macrophylla
Eudicots of Western Australia
Asterales of Australia
Plants described in 1854
Taxa named by George Bentham